Cebu City National Science High School, commonly known as Sci-Hi or Science High, is one of the pioneering science schools in Cebu City, Philippines.

History
Cebu City National Science High School, commonly known as Sci-Hi is a Secondary Science public High School system located in Salvador St. Labangon, Cebu City, Philippines. It was founded on July 17, 1970, and nationalized in the 1974–1975 school year.

The Cebu City National Science High School, which had been known as Cebu City Science High School, was established on July 17, 1970, as the brainchild of Dr. Aurelio A. Tiro, the then Cebu City Schools Division Superintendent. The school's overall concept was patterned after the objectives of the Philippine Science High School and in line with the Government's Science and Technological Education and Manpower Development Program.

On April 28, 1970, Resolution No. 81 of the Cebu City School Board was passed by the Hon. City Councilor Raymundo Crystal, who was then Chairman of the Committee on Education, and requested the Cebu City Council to initiate the funding of a Cebu City Science High School with an appropriation of P50,000. Then it was followed with Resolution No. 772 of the Cebu City Council on May 7, 1970, appropriating the requested amount for the establishment of the school during the incumbency of Honorable Mayor Eulogio Borres. The school was nationalized under Presidential Decree 105 in SY 1974–1975.

Cebu City Science High School was established in Barangay Labangon in its present site, which is a property donated by Don Sergio Osmeña, Sr. to the City Government. The first building of the school was a modified 3-unit steel pre-fab Marcos-type school building. The school drew a development plan, and the founding principal, Mrs. Rosalina R. Kintanar, sought direct financial aid from the Office of the President in order to construct a two-storey Academic Library (AL) Building. The Science Building (SB) that was reconstructed from the pre-fab Marcos-type original, the ESEP Building, and the School Gymnasium were added during the administration of Mrs. Nicanora P. Creus. Succeeding principals also had their share in the development of school buildings and facilities.

With her ingenuity and brilliance, the founding principal, Mrs. Rosalina R. Kintanar pioneered in gathering 64 intelligent students and 5 competent teachers who started with what is now the Cebu City National Science High School.

The founding principal was succeeded by equally competent administrators in the persons of Mr. Tereso M. Edo, who was appointed in April 1982, Mrs. Nicanora P. Creus in October 1985, Mrs. Pilar A. Tesaluna in February 1999, Mrs. Severina B. Chin as OIC from May 2001-July 2001, Mr. Jesus G. Ortiz in August 2001 and presently Mrs. Severina B. Chin as OIC from June 2002-October 2002 and finally re-appointed on November 15, 2002. In June 2012  Mrs. Marites V. Patiño  was appointed as the Principal. Currently, the school is being headed by Dr. Evelyn R. Pielago which assumed office in June 2017.

Admission
To better prepare each student for the tasks, activities and responsibilities that lie ahead, each student must pass both written (conducted on the third Saturday of February) and oral (conducted on the second Saturday of March) entrance examinations.

All applicants must be part of the upper 10% of their graduating class and must have at least a grade of 85% in Science, Math, and English and 83% or above in all other subject areas in any grading period or the equivalent grade as to the grading system used by a school as duly certified by its principal. Pupils graduating from Science Elementary classes are required with a grade of at least 83% in Science, Math, and English and 80% in all other subject areas.

The examination is in Science, Math and Mental Ability with which the examinee must get 83% and 80% of the total score in Science and Math, respectively, and at least an above average IQ. Hence, all successful examinees qualify for an interview that tackles all subject areas. The screening committee determines the top 175 students (formerly 140) who have to confirm for enrollment. Finally, all 175 enrollees should attend the school's orientation program as scheduled together with their parents or guardian.

Gallery

References 

http://www.everythingcebu.com/cebu-profile-basic-info/schools/cebu-city-national-science-high-school-2/

Schools in Cebu City
Educational institutions established in 1970
High schools in Cebu
Public schools in the Philippines
1970 establishments in the Philippines